Cara Hartstock (born 18 March 1994) is a German handball player for Buxtehuder SV in the Frauen Handball-Bundesliga.

Hartstock represented the German junior national team, where she participated at the 2014 Women's Junior World Handball Championship, placing 4th.

In February 2022, she signed a 1-year contract with the Bundesliga club Buxtehuder SV. She has previously played for HSG Blomberg-Lippe, TuS Metzingen, VfL Oldenburg and HC Leipzig.

Achievements
Bundesliga:
Bronze: 2020
DHB-Pokal:
Winner: 2018
Finalist: 2015

References

External links

1994 births
Living people
German female handball players
People from Lübeck
Sportspeople from Lübeck